Federico Mazzarani (born 1 July 2000) is an Italian professional footballer who plays as a centre back for  club  Ternana.

Club career
Born in Rome, Mazzarani started his career in Ternana youth system. He made his first team debut on 29 July 2018 against Pontedera for Coppa Italia.

On 10 July 2019, he was loaned to Pistoiese.

On 22 July 2021, he joined Serie C club Pro Sesto on loan.

References

External links
 
 

2000 births
Living people
Footballers from Rome
Italian footballers
Association football defenders
Serie C players
Ternana Calcio players
U.S. Pistoiese 1921 players
Pro Sesto 2013 players
Serie B players